DWHI (100.3 FM) was a radio station owned and operated by Hypersonic Broadcasting Center. It was formerly known as Z100.3 Zagitsit News FM from its inception on October 30, 2015 to November 8, 2021, when it went off the air due to violation of some policies for provisional authority in broadcasting, which were dismissed by the management as politics.

References

Radio stations in Legazpi, Albay
Radio stations established in 2016
Radio stations disestablished in 2021